Happy is Matthew West's debut studio album for a major label, released on December 26, 2003. It was followed by History, Sellout (re-release), and Something to Say.

Track listing

Personnel 
 Matthew West – lead vocals, backing vocals, acoustic guitar
 Greg Bieck – programming (1)
 Solomon Olds – programming (2)
 Sam Mizell – keyboards, programming (3, 6, 7), backing vocals 
 Jimmy Collins – keyboards, programming (4, 8, 9, 10), electric guitars, backing vocals 
 Kenny Greenberg – acoustic guitar, electric guitars, backing vocals 
 B. James Lowery – acoustic guitar
 Mark Hill – bass 
 Jimmie Lee Sloas – bass 
 Chris McHugh – drums 
 Eric Darken – percussion
 Jonathan Yudkin – strings, string arrangements 
 Jason Houser – backing vocals

Production 
 Kenny Greenberg – producer 
 Jason Houser – producer 
 David Leonard – recording, mixing (1)
 Miles Logan – additional recording, mixing (3, 4, 5, 7-11)
 James Warner – recording assistant 
 J. R. McNeely – mixing (2)
 Joe Baldridge – mixing (6)
 Joe Costa – mix assistant (6)
 Ken Love – mastering 
 Jan Cook – art direction 
 Tim Frank – art direction 
 Clark Hook – art direction, design 
 Susan Levy – art direction
 Emily West – art direction
 Michael Levine – photography 
 Sasha Harford – hair stylist, make-up 
 Miles Siggins – wardrobe 

Studios
 Recorded at Ken's Gold Club and Quad Studios (Nashville, Tennessee).
 Mixed at Ken's Gold Club and East Iris Studios (Nashville, Tennessee); The Sound Kitchen and FM2 Studios (Franklin, Tennessee).
 Mastered at MasterMix (Nashville, Tennessee).

Radio singles 

"More" was released to Christian radio in late 2003 and peaked at No. 1 on the Billboard Christian Songs chart starting March 27, 2004 for 6 weeks in 2004, and spent a total of 60 weeks on the chart.

Awards

In 2005, the album won a Dove Award for Recorded Music Packaging of the Year at the 36th GMA Dove Awards. It was also nominated for Pop/Contemporary Album of the Year.

References

2003 debut albums
Sparrow Records albums
Matthew West albums